Apursam-Shapur was an Iranian aristocrat, who is the first person mentioned as a darigbed ("palace superintendent") under the Sasanian Empire. He served as darigbed under Shapur I (r. 240-270), and is also mentioned in the latters inscription at Naqsh-e Rostam.

Sources 
 

3rd-century Iranian people
3rd-century deaths
Year of birth unknown